Kenneth James Lawler, Jr. (born June 25, 1994) is a professional gridiron football wide receiver for the Winnipeg Blue Bombers of the Canadian Football League (CFL). He was drafted by the Seattle Seahawks in the seventh round, 243rd overall, of the 2016 NFL Draft. He played college football at California.

Early years
Lawler attended Upland High School in Upland, California. He had 53 receptions for 1,267 yards and 12 touchdowns as a senior and 42 receptions for 887 yards and nine touchdowns as a junior. Lawler was rated by Rivals.com as four-star recruit and committed to the University of California, Berkeley to play college football.

College career
Lawler redshirted his first year at California in 2012 after he was ineligible the first six weeks while NCAA looked into some independent-study classes he had taken. He considered transferring in the offseason due to the firing of head coach Jeff Tedford, but chose to stay at California after meeting with the newly hired head coach Sonny Dykes.

In 2013, he played in 11 games with five starts and had 37 receptions for 347 yards and five touchdowns. As a sophomore, he again played in 11 games with five starts and led the team with 54 receptions for 701 yards and nine touchdowns. As a junior, Lawler had 52 receptions for 658 yards and 13 touchdowns over 13 games. After his junior season, Lawler entered the 2016 NFL Draft.

Professional career
Prior to the 2016 NFL Draft, Lawler had been projected by NFL scouts and analysts to be a middle-round pick. Lawler slid in part due to his leaner frame and his slower 40-yard dash time.

Seattle Seahawks 
On April 30, 2016, the Seattle Seahawks selected Lawler with a seventh round pick, 243rd overall in the 2016 NFL Draft. On May 6, 2016, the Seahawks announced that they had signed Lawler to his rookie contract. On September 3, 2016, he was released by the Seahawks as part of final roster cuts and was signed to the practice squad. He signed a reserve/future contract with the Seahawks on January 16, 2017. On September 2, 2017, Lawler was waived by the Seahawks and was later signed to their practice squad. He was released by the team on September 13, 2017.

BC Lions 
The BC Lions announced on May 9, 2018, they had signed Lawler to a contract, along with four other wide receivers.

Winnipeg Blue Bombers 
The Winnipeg Blue Bombers signed Lawler to their practice roster on October 22, 2018. Lawler became a regular contributor for the Blue Bombers during the 2019 season, with his breakout game coming in a loss against Hamilton, where he caught 10 passes for 144 yards. As the leading receiver on the team in yards, Lawler helped the Bombers to their first Grey Cup win in 29 years, when they won the 107th Grey Cup at the end of the 2019 season.

After the CFL canceled the 2020 season due to the COVID-19 pandemic, Lawler chose to opt-out of his contract with the Blue Bombers on August 27, 2020. He signed a one-year contract extension with Winnipeg on February 3, 2021. Midway through the 2021 season, on October 4, 2021 it was revealed that Lawler had been arrested for impaired driving and was suspended for the team's Week 10 match. Despite the struggles in his personal life, Lawler went on to lead the CFL in receiving with 1,014 yards and six touchdowns. As a result, Lawler was named both a CFL West All-Star and CFL All-Star for the first time. The Bombers finished the year with the best regular season record. Winnipeg defeated Saskatchewan to go to 108th Grey Cup, their second consecutive championship game. They won in overtime to win their second Grey Cup in a row. Lawler added 90 yards receiving in the postseason to help the Blue Bombers to their second title.

Edmonton Elks

Lawler signed with the Edmonton Elks to a one-year contract to open free agency on February 8, 2022, and became the highest paid receiver in the CFL. In late August 2022 Lawler suffered an ankle injury. At the time of the injury he was tied for second place in both receptions (56) and receiving yards (849). He returned to action on October 1 against the Montreal Alouettes. However, a couple days later it was reported that Lawler had suffered a shoulder/collarbone injury and underwent season ending surgery. He finished the season with 58 receptions for 894 yards and five touchdowns. He became a free agent upon the expiry of his contract on February 14, 2023.

Winnipeg Blue Bombers (II)
On the first day of free agency, on February 14, 2023, it was announced that Lawler had signed a two-year contract with the Winnipeg Blue Bombers.

Statistics

Personal life
Lawler Jr. recently had a son, Kenneth James Lawler II. Lawler's siblings; Perri, Sydney and Kenzel. Younger brother is a Junior at Roosevelt High School, QB on Varsity. Lawler's mother, Patricia Hicks works in the medical field and his father is Kenneth Lawler Sr.,who played college football as a cornerback at Oregon and later became a coach at Mt. Sac Junior College, went on to coach at Boise State and now at San Bernardino Valley College. With his wife, Mary, combined have six children.

References

External links
Winnipeg Blue Bombers bio
Seattle Seahawks bio
California Golden Bears bio

1994 births
Living people
Sportspeople from Pomona, California
Players of American football from California
American football wide receivers
California Golden Bears football players
Seattle Seahawks players
Winnipeg Blue Bombers players
Canadian football wide receivers
American players of Canadian football